Puyun-guyŏk is a district of the 7 kuyŏk that constitute Chongjin, North Hamgyong Province, North Korea.

Administrative divisions 
Puyun-guyok is divided into 7 neighbourhoods (tong) and one village (ri).

References 

Districts of Chongjin